Wiedźmin (The Hexer or The Witcher in English) is a Polish fantasy television series that aired in 2002.

The story is based on the stories of The Witcher fantasy series (The Last Wish and Sword of Destiny collections), by Polish author Andrzej Sapkowski.

Plot 
The Hexer begins with the childhood of Geralt of Rivia (Michał Żebrowski), who is a traveling monster hunter. Vesemir collected the child while invoking the Law of Surprise. The series then follows him train at Kaer Morhen, develop his abilities, and mutate.

Reception 
The series has been described as better than the movie which preceded it, but the poor critical and fan reception of the movie, which was described as a glorified, incoherent trailer for the TV show, was cited as one of the reasons for the series cancellation after 13 episodes. Sapkowski has also criticized the television adaptation.

Episodes

References

External links 
 
 Wiedźmin Episode guide 
 Internet archive 2002 series streaming

2002 Polish television series debuts
Polish drama television series
The Witcher
2000s Polish television series
H
Television shows based on Polish novels
Polish-language television shows